Ian Craig Leslie OAM (born 6 July 1942) is an Indonesian-born Australian television journalist and corporate communicator.

Early life

Ian Craig Leslie was born in Java, Dutch East Indies (now Indonesia). Leslie was born one of twins in Bandung, Indonesia, under Japanese occupation, to his mother Lydia. He had an elder brother, sister and two aunts. At the time, his father William was interned in a POW camp in West central Java and would not see the twins until the Japanese surrender three and a half years later. His father was from Aberdeen, Scotland, and his mother was born in Gnadenfeld, Ukraine. Both migrated from war-torn Europe for a better life in the thriving Dutch-British East Indies. His mother’s family was of white Russian origin and fled their homeland to escape persecution under the Communist Bolshevik tyranny. 

They raised their four children in Java, where William Leslie was a manager for a large Anglo-Dutch export company.  An idyllic life ended abruptly with the Japanese Imperial Army’s invasion in February 1942. For his first three years, Ian and his family spent life behind bamboo as POWs in a separate camp to his father.  Despite the ravages of prison life and starvation, disease, and lack of medical aid, the Leslies survived. In August 1945, at the end of the Pacific War, the Leslies were evacuated back to Scotland. 

In 1947, William Leslie took his family back to Indonesia to resume life and career. What they saw was a very different country to the one they had left three years earlier. Nationalism had replaced Dutch-Anglo colonial rule.  Communist insurgents under President Sukarno waged a war of independence. Indonesia was no longer a safe place to raise a family, with politically motivated attacks on Europeans becoming a daily occurrence. In 1950, they moved to Toowoomba, Queensland, Australia. Ian Leslie is a member of the Australian branch of Clan Leslie.

Ian was educated at Church of England Boys Prep and Toowoomba State High.

Honours and awards  
 Logie Award 1973 Best News Report
 Walkley Award 1979 Best Current Affairs Report
 Logie Award 1981 Outstanding Public Affairs Report
 Logie Award 1985 Reporter of the Year
 Medal of the Order of Australia (OAM) in the Queen's Birthday Honours 2009 for services to the media in current affairs journalism, and to the community
 He was a visiting fellow at the American Library in Paris in the spring of 2019

Television career 
Leslie became a cadet journalist in Toowoomba in 1962 with the local newspaper/television group, rising to News Editor. He moved to Sydney in 1972 as a senior reporter with the Ten Network. In 1977, he transferred to the Nine Network to join A Current Affair. 

In 1979, the Australian edition of 60 Minutes was launched on the Nine Network, with Ian Leslie, Ray Martin and George Negus as the original reporting team. He remained in that role for the next 11 years, until 1989.

In his time with 60 Minutes, he is best remembered for his compassionate reporting, especially where children were involved, and for his unwavering commitment to expose suffering in Australia and in developing countries.

Leslie covered conflicts in most of the world's major trouble spots: Uganda, Zimbabwe, Mozambique, Lebanon, Thailand, Cambodia, Philippines, Burma, Korea, Indonesia, Afghanistan and Northern Ireland.

He is the only Australian journalist to have interviewed the Egyptian President Anwar Sadat.

He interviewed many other world leaders, including Indian Prime Minister Moraji Desai, Pakistan Prime Minister Benazir Bhutto, Presidents Ferdinand Marcos (Philippines), Godfrey Beniza, Milton Obote and Yoweri Muzeweri (all of Uganda).

In 1989, he re-joined the Ten Network to manage and produce primetime documentaries and special projects, becoming the Ten Evening News anchor.

In 1990, Ian Leslie formed a production company specialising in corporate communications.

In 2005 he anchored Fox Television's award-winning documentary series Running On Empty.

Incident with Moro guerrilla 
On a 60 Minutes assignment in the Philippines, a Moro guerrilla pulled a revolver from his holster, put it against Leslie's head, and pulled the trigger. Leslie had no idea the gun was not loaded.

Personal life 

In 1966, Leslie married Jan Penhaligon. They have two children—Jayne and Peter—and three grandchildren: Zavia, Tahlia, and Sienna. Jan was educated at PGC College, Warwick. She has a degree in Music, A Mus A and ATCL (Associate Trinity College London), having topped the State’s music exams. Daughter Jayne has a degree in Drama from the West Australian Academy of Dramatic Arts. She runs her own business coaching company. Son Peter is an accomplished television cameraman, covering major sporting events in Australia and overseas, including the Sydney 2000 Olympics and Beijing 2008 Olympics.

References

1942 births
60 Minutes (Australian TV program) correspondents
Australian television journalists
Living people
Logie Award winners
People from Toowoomba
Recipients of the Medal of the Order of Australia
10 News First presenters
Walkley Award winners
Australian people of Indonesian descent
Australian people of Scottish descent
Australian people of Ukrainian descent